Danny O'Connor (died 27 April 2017) was a New Zealand international lawn bowls player.

Bowls career
He won a silver medal in the men's fours at the 1982 Commonwealth Games in Brisbane with Rowan Brassey, Morgan Moffat and Jim Scott. 

He won ten New Zealand National Bowls Championships titles; the 1975, 1979, 1981, 1982, 1990, 1995, 2005 & 2014 fours, the 1982 pairs and the 1983 singles.

He died on 27 April 2017.

References

New Zealand male bowls players
Commonwealth Games silver medallists for New Zealand
Bowls players at the 1982 Commonwealth Games
Commonwealth Games medallists in lawn bowls
Year of birth missing
2017 deaths
20th-century New Zealand people
21st-century New Zealand people
Medallists at the 1982 Commonwealth Games